Johann Melchior Wyrsch (August 21, 1732 – September 9, 1798) was a Swiss painter of the 18th century.

Life 

Johann Melchior Wyrsch was born on August 21, 1732, in Buochs, Unterwalden. He was the son of Balthazar Francis Xavier, Councillor, bailiff and Diet envoy, and Anna Klara Achermann. Wyrsch began his art studies 1745 as a portrait painter with Johann Michael Suter in Lucerne and Franz Anton Kraus in Einsiedeln as teachers.

Between 1753 and 1754 he spent a study tour in Italy, where he mainly resided in Rome and Naples. After his art studies in Italy, he returned to Switzerland and began his artistic activity as a portrait and church painter. In 1768 he moved to Besançon, where he painted many portraits of respected people.

Together with the sculptor Luc Breton, whom he had met in Rome, he founded in 1773 the academy for painting and drawing   ( Académie de Peinture et de dessin  ) in Besançon.

In 1877 he traveled to Paris, and returned to Besançon, where he was appointed in 1784 an honorary citizen. In the same year he moved to Lucerne, where he proposed to the Council of Lucerne in 1783 to found a School of Drawing with the task to teach talented young students in drawing and modeling.

With an increasing blindness ascribed to cataracts, he withdrew to Buochs, where at the Conquest Nidwalden he was murdered by the troops of Napoleon Bonaparte.

Legacy
In the transition from Baroque and rococo on the one hand to Classical and Romanticism on the other hand Wyrsch participated in the development of portraits for differentiated characterization of a single individual.

He was enshrined in the "enlightened paternalism" of the Old Confederation, however, his work has been on the liberal bourgeois era.

He painted as a religious painter numerous altars in Central Switzerland and the Franche-Comté that are still adorned with his paintings.

He remained a central Swiss painter of the late Baroque.

In 1780 the abbot of Disentis, Columban Sozzi, paid attention to the talent of Felix Maria Diogg (1762–1834), and enabled him to travel to Wyrsch in Besançon.

Literature 

 Matthias Vogel, Regine Helbling, Marianne Baltensperger (Eds.):  Powdered and cleaned. Johann Melchior Wyrsch 1732–1798. Portraitist and church painter , Schwabe, 1998. 
 Dr. Paul Fischer:   The painter Johann Melchior Wyrsch of Buochs, 1732 - 1798 | His Life and Work, commission publishing, bookstore C. Bachmann, Zurich 1938
 Johann Kaspar Fuessli: History of the best artists in Switzerland  Johann Melchior Joseph Würsch (page 102-109), Orell, Gessner, Füsslin and Comp, Zurich, 1779
 Wyrsch, Johann (Jean) Melchior Joseph (Josef) , Swiss Institute for Art Research, Hans-Peter Wittwer

References

Historisches Lexikon der Schweiz  
This article was initially translated from the German Wikipedia.

18th-century Swiss painters
18th-century Swiss male artists
Swiss male painters
1732 births
1798 deaths